Bladder cancer is any of several types of cancer arising from the tissues of the urinary bladder. Symptoms include blood in the urine, pain with urination, and low back pain. It is caused when epithelial cells that line the bladder become malignant.

Risk factors for bladder cancer include smoking, family history, prior radiation therapy, frequent bladder infections, and exposure to certain chemicals. The most common type is transitional cell carcinoma. Other types include squamous cell carcinoma and adenocarcinoma. Diagnosis is typically by cystoscopy with tissue biopsies. Staging of the cancer is determined by transurethral resection and medical imaging.

Treatment depends on the stage of the cancer. It may include some combination of surgery, radiation therapy, chemotherapy, or immunotherapy. Surgical options may include transurethral resection, partial or complete removal of the bladder, or urinary diversion. The typical five-year survival rates in the United States is 77%, Canada is 75%, and Europe is 68%.

Bladder cancer, as of 2018, affected about 1.6 million people globally with 549,000 new cases and 200,000 deaths. Age of onset is most often between 65 and 84 years of age. Males are more often affected than females. In 2018, the highest rate of bladder cancer occurred in Southern and Western Europe followed by North America with rates of 15, 13, and 12 cases per 100,000 people. The highest rates of bladder cancer deaths were seen in Northern Africa and Western Asia followed by Southern Europe.

Signs and symptoms

Bladder cancer characteristically causes blood in the urine, which may be visible or detectable only by microscope. Blood in the urine is the most common symptom in bladder cancer, and is painless. Visible blood in the urine may be of only short duration, and a urine test may be required to confirm non-visible blood. Between 80 and 90% of people with bladder cancer initially presented with visible blood. Blood in the urine may also be caused by other conditions, such as bladder or ureteric stones, infection, kidney disease, kidney cancers or vascular malformations, though these conditions (except kidney cancers) would typically be painful.

Other possible symptoms include pain during urination, frequent urination, or feeling the need to urinate without being able to do so. These signs and symptoms are not specific to bladder cancer, and may also be caused by non-cancerous conditions, including prostate infections, overactive bladder or cystitis. Some rare forms of bladder cancer like urachal adenocarcinoma produce mucin, which is then excreted in the urine causing it to be thick.

People with advanced disease may have pelvic or bony pain, lower-extremity swelling, or flank pain. Rarely, a palpable mass can be detected on physical examination.

Causes

Smoking

Tobacco smoking is the main known contributor to urinary bladder cancer; in most populations, smoking is associated with over half of bladder cancer cases in men and one-third of cases among women, however these proportions have reduced over recent years since there are fewer smokers in Europe and North America. There is an almost linear relationship between smoking duration (in years), pack years and bladder cancer risk. A risk plateau at smoking about 15 cigarettes a day can be observed (meaning that those who smoke 15 cigarettes a day are approximately at the same risk as those smoking 30 cigarettes a day). Smoking in any form (cigar, pipe, Egyptian waterpipe and smokeless tobacco) increases the risk for bladder cancer. Quitting smoking reduces the risk. Risk of bladder cancer decreases by 30% within 1–4 years and continues to decrease by 60% at 25 years after smoking cessation. However, former smokers will most likely always be at a higher risk of bladder cancer compared to people who have never smoked. Passive smoking also appear to be a risk.

Opium consumption increases the risk of bladder cancer by 3-fold and concurrent use of opium and smoking increases the risk of bladder cancer by 5 times compared to the general population.

Occupational exposure

Thirty percent of bladder tumors probably result from occupational exposure in the workplace to carcinogens. Occupational or circumstantial exposure to the following substances has been implicated as a cause of bladder cancer; benzidine (dyes manufacturing), 4-aminobiphenyl (rubber industry), 2-naphtylamine (azo dyes manufacturing, foundry fumes, rubber industry, cigarette smoke and cancer research), phenacetin (analgesic), arsenic and chlorinated aliphatic hydrocarbons in drinking water, auramine (dye manufacturing), magenta (dye manufacturing), ortho-toluidine (dye manufacturing), epoxy and polyurethane resin hardening agents (plastics industry), chlornaphazine, coal-tar pitch. Occupations at risk are bus drivers, rubber workers, painters, motor mechanics, leather (including shoe) workers, blacksmiths, machine setters, and mechanics. Hairdressers are thought to be at risk as well because of their frequent exposure to permanent hair dyes.

Infection

Infection with Schistosoma haematobium (bilharzia or schistosomiasis) may cause bladder cancer, specially of the squamous cell type. Schistosoma eggs induces a chronic inflammatory state in the bladder wall resulting in tissue fibrosis. Higher levels of N-nitroso compounds has been detected in urine samples of people with schistosomiasis. N-Nitroso compounds have been implicated in the pathogenesis of schistosomiasis related bladder cancer. They cause alkylation DNA damage, specially Guanine to Adenine transition mutations in the HRAS and p53 tumor suppressor gene. Mutations of p53 are detected in 73% of the tumors, BCL-2 mutations accounting for 32% and the combination of the two accounting for 13%. Other causes of squamous cell carcinoma of the bladder include chronic catheterizations in people with a spinal cord injury and history of treatment with cyclophosphamide.

Diet

The American Institute for Cancer Research have stated that there is strong evidence that drinking water containing arsenic increases the risk of bladder cancer.

High consumption of animal fat and dietary cholesterol increases bladder cancer risk in men.

Ingestion of aristolochic acid present in many Chinese herbal medications has been shown to cause urothelial carcinoma and kidney failure. Aristolochic acid activates peroxidase in the urothelium and causes transversion mutation in the TP53 tumor suppressor gene.

Other

People who undergo external beam radiotherapy (EBRT) for prostate cancer have a higher risk of developing invasive bladder cancer.

In addition to these major risk factors there are also numerous other modifiable factors that are less strongly (i.e. 10–20% risk increase) associated with bladder cancer, for example, obesity. Although these could be considered as minor effects, risk reduction in the general population could still be achieved by reducing the prevalence of a number of smaller risk factor together.

Genetics
Mutations in FGFR3, TP53, PIK3CA, KDM6A, ARID1A, KMT2D, HRAS, TERT, KRAS, CREBBP, RB1 and TSC1 genes may be associated with some cases of bladder cancer. Deletions of parts or whole of chromosome 9 is common in bladder cancer. Low grade cancer are known to harbor mutations in RAS pathway and the fibroblast growth factor receptor 3 (FGFR3) gene, both of which play a role in the MAPK/ERK pathway. p53 and RB gene mutations are implicated in high-grade muscle invasive tumors. Eighty nine percent of muscle invasive cancers have mutations in chromatin remodeling and histone modifying genes.
Deletion of both copies of the GSTM1 gene has a modest increase in risk of bladder cancer. GSTM1 gene product glutathione S-transferase M1 (GSTM1) participates in the detoxification process of carcinogens such as polycyclic aromatic hydrocarbons found in cigarette smoke. Similarly, mutations in NAT2 (N-acetyltransferase) is associated with increased risk for bladder cancer. N-acetyltransferase helps in detoxification of carcinogens like aromatic amines (also present in cigarette smoke). Various single-nucleotide polymorphisms in PSCA gene present on chromosome 8 have shown to increase the risk for bladder cancer. PSCA gene promoter region has an androgen response region. Loss of reactivity of this region to androgens is hypothesized as a cause of more number of aggressive tumors in women (unlike in men who have higher amount of androgen).

Muscle invasive bladder cancer are heterogeneous in nature. In general, they can be genetically classified into basal and luminal subtypes. Basal subtype show alterations involving RB and NFE2L2 and luminal type show changes in FGFR3 and KDM6A genes. Basal subtype are subdivided into basal and claudin low-type group and are aggressive and show metastasis at presentation, however they respond to platinum based chemotherapy. Luminal subtype can be subdivided into p53-like and luminal. p53-like tumors of luminal subtype although not as aggressive as basal type, show resistance to chemotherapy

Diagnosis

Currently, the best diagnosis of the state of the bladder is by way of cystoscopy, which is a procedure in which a flexible or rigid tube (called a cystoscope) bearing a camera and various instruments is inserted into the bladder through the urethra. The flexible procedure allows for a visual inspection of the bladder, for minor remedial work to be undertaken and for samples of suspicious lesions to be taken for a biopsy. A rigid cystoscope is used under general anesthesia in the operating room and can support remedial work and biopsies as well as more extensive tumor removal. Unlike papillary lesion, which grow into the bladder cavity and are readily visible, carcinoma in situ lesion are flat and obscure. Detection of carcinoma in situ lesions requires multiple biopsies from different areas of interior bladder wall. Photodynamic detection (blue light cystoscopy) can aid in the detection of carcinoma in situ. In photodynamic detection, a dye is instilled into the bladder with the help of a catheter. Cancer cells take up this dye and are visible under blue light, providing visual clues on areas to be biopsied or resected.

However, visual detection in any form listed above, is not sufficient for establishing pathological classification, cell type or the stage of the present tumor. A so-called cold cup biopsy during an ordinary cystoscopy (rigid or flexible) will not be sufficient for pathological staging either. Hence, a visual detection needs to be followed by transurethral surgery. The procedure is called transurethral resection of bladder tumor (TURBT). Further, a rectal and vaginal bimanual examination should be carried out before and after the TURBT to assess whether there is a palpable mass or if the tumour is fixed ("tethered") to the pelvic wall. The pathological classification and staging information obtained by the TURBT-procedure, is of fundamental importance for making the appropriate choice of ensuing treatment and/or follow-up routines.

If invasive or high grade (includes carcinoma in situ) cancer is detected on TURBT, an MRI and/or CT scan of the abdomen and pelvis or urogram and CT chest should be conducted for disease staging and to look for cancer spread (metastasis). Increase in alkaline phosphatase levels without evidence of liver disease should be evaluated for bone metastasis by a bone scan. Although 18F-fluorodeoxyglucose (FDG)-positron emission tomography (PET)/CT has been explored as a viable method for staging, there is no consensus to support its role in routine clinical evaluations.

Urine cytology can be obtained in voided urine or at the time of the cystoscopy ("bladder washing"). Cytology is not very sensitive for low-grade or grade 1 tumors (a negative result cannot reliably exclude bladder cancer) but has a high specificity (a positive result reliably detects bladder cancer). There are newer non-invasive urine bound markers available as aids in the diagnosis of bladder cancer, including human complement factor H-related protein, high-molecular-weight carcinoembryonic antigen, and nuclear matrix protein 22 (NMP22). In United States the FDA has approved NMP22, NMP22 BladderChek, and UroVysion tests for detection and surveillance of bladder cancer and ImmunoCyt, BTA-TRAK, and BTA-STAT tests have been approved for surveillance only. BTA-STAT and BladderChek can be performed in the clinic and others are done in the laboratory. Other non-invasive urine based tests include the CertNDx Bladder Cancer Assay, which detects FGFR3 mutation and Urine Bladder Cancer test (UBC), which is a sandwich ELISA for Cytokeratin 8/18 fragment. Likewise, NMP22 is a sandwich ELISA and NMP22 BladderChek is a dipstick immunoassay, both of them detect nuclear mitotic apparatus protein (NuMA) tumor marker (a type of nuclear matrix protein). UroVysion is a fluorescence in situ hybridization which detects aneuploidy in chromosomes 3, 7, 17 and loss of the 9p21 locus. ImmunoCyt is an Immunofluorescence test which detects glycosylated CEA and MUCIN-like antigens (M344, LDQ10, 19A11). BTA-STAT is a dipstick immunoassay for detection of human complement factor H-related protein. BTA-TRAK is a sandwich ELISA which also detects human complement factor H-related protein. Sensitivities across biomarkers ranged from 0.57 to 0.82 and specificities from 0.74 to 0.88. Biomarkers fared better when used in combination with urine cytology than when used alone. However, detection accuracy is poor for low grade cancers and 10% cancers are still missed. Current guidelines do not recommended using urinary biomarkers for detection and surveillance.

Classification

Non-papillary carcinoma includes carcinoma in situ (CIS), microinvasive carcinoma and frankly invasive carcinoma. Carcinoma in situ (CIS) invariably consists of cytologically high-grade tumour cells.

Transitional cell carcinoma can undergo differentiation (25%) into its variants. When seen under a microscope, papillary transitional cell carcinoma can present in its typical form or as one of its variations (squamous, glandular differentiation or micropapillary variant). Different variations of non-papillary transitional cell carcinoma are listed below.

Staging

Bladder cancer is staged (classified by the extent of spread of the cancer) and graded (how abnormal and aggressive the cells appear under the microscope) to determine treatment and predict outcomes. Staging is usually performed with transurethral resection of bladder tumor (TURBT) and radiologic imaging (CT and MRI). Papillary tumors confined to the mucosa or which invade the lamina propria are classified as Ta or T1. Flat lesions that do not invade the basement membrane of the bladder mucosa are termed Tis (in situ). All three categories (Tis, Ta and T1) are grouped together as non-muscle invasive disease for therapeutic purposes and in most cases they are offered cystoscopic resection with TURBT without the need for radical resection of the entire urinary bladder. Tumors in the remaining categories (T2, T3 and T4) are termed muscle-invasive disease and are associated with less favorable prognosis.

In the TNM staging system (8th Edn. 2017) for bladder cancer:

T (Primary tumour)
 TX Primary tumour cannot be assessed
 T0 No evidence of primary tumour
 Ta Non-invasive papillary carcinoma
 Tis Carcinoma in situ ('flat tumour')
 T1 Tumour invades subepithelial connective tissue
 T2a Tumour invades superficial muscle (inner half of the detrusor muscle)
 T2b Tumour invades deep muscle (outer half of the detrusor muscle)
 T3 Tumour invades perivesical tissue:
 T3a Microscopically
 T3b Macroscopically (extravesical mass)
 T4a Tumour invades prostate, uterus or vagina
 T4b Tumour invades pelvic wall or abdominal wall

N (Lymph nodes)
 NX Regional lymph nodes cannot be assessed
 N0 No regional lymph node metastasis
 N1 Metastasis in a single lymph node in true pelvis (hypogastric, obturator, external iliac, or presacral nodes)
 N2 Metastasis in multiple lymph nodes in true pelvis (hypogastric, obturator, external iliac, or presacral nodes)
 N3 Metastasis in common iliac lymph nodes

M (Distant metastasis)
 MX Distant metastasis cannot be assessed
 M0 No distant metastasis
 M1 Distant metastasis.
 M1a: The cancer has spread only to lymph nodes outside of the pelvis.
 M1b: The cancer has spread other parts of the body.

The most common sites for bladder cancer metastases are the lymph nodes, bones, lung, liver, and peritoneum. The most common sentinel lymph nodes draining bladder cancer are obturator and internal iliac lymph nodes. The location of lymphatic spread depends on the location of the tumors. Tumors on the superolateral bladder wall spread to external iliac lymph nodes. Tumors on the neck, anterior wall and fundus spread commonly to the internal iliac lymph nodes. From the regional lymph nodes (i.e. obturator, internal and external lymph nodes) the cancer spreads to distant sites like the common iliac lymph nodes and paraaortic lymph nodes. Skipped lymph node lesions are not seen in bladder cancer.

Numerical
The stages above can be integrated into a numerical staging (with Roman numerals) as follows:

Grading
According to WHO classification (1973) bladder cancers are histologically graded into:
 G1 – Well differentiated,
 G2 – Moderately differentiated
 G3 – Poorly differentiated

WHO classification (2004/2016)
 Papillary lesions
 Urothelial Papilloma
 Papillary urothelial neoplasm of low malignant potential (PUNLMP)
 Low Grade
 High Grade
 Flat lesions
 Urothelial proliferation of uncertain malignant potential
 Reactive atypia
 Atypia of unknown significance
 Urothelial dysplasia
 Urothelial CIS (always high grade)
 Primary
 Secondary
 Concurrent

Risk stratification 

People with non-muscle invasive bladder cancer (NMIBC), are risk-stratified based on clinical and pathological factors so that they are treated appropriately depending on their probability of having progression and/or recurrence. People with non-muscle invasive tumors are categorized into low-risk, intermediate-risk and high-risk or provided with a numerical risk score. Risk-stratification framework is provided by American Urology Association/Society of Urological Oncology (AUA/SUO stratification), European Association of Urology (EAU) guidelines, European Organization for Research and Treatment of Cancer (EORTC) risk tables and Club Urológico Español de Tratamiento Oncológico (CUETO) scoring model.

The EORTC and CUETO model use a cumulative score obtained from individual prognostic factors, which are then converted into risk of progression and recurrence. The six prognostic factors included in the EORTC model are number of tumors, recurrence rate, T-stage, presence of carcinoma-in-situ and grade of the tumor. Scoring for recurrence in the CUETO model incorporates 6 variables; age, gender, grade, tumor status, number of tumors and presence of tis. For progression scoring the previous 6 variables plus T stage is used.

Prevention

Diet

As of 2019, there is limited high level evidence to suggest that eating vegetable and fruits decreases the risk of bladder cancer. Fruit and yellow-orange vegetables, particularly carrots and those containing selenium, citrus fruits and cruciferous vegetables have been identified as having a possibly protective effect.

While it is suggested that the polyphenol compounds in tea may have an inhibitory effect on bladder tumor formation and growth, there is limited evidence to suggesting drinking tea decreases bladder cancer risk. A 2022 review found that a Mediterranean diet has a protective effect on bladder cancer risk. Higher consumption of monounsaturated fat and plant-based oils decrease bladder cancer risk in women. Higher consumption of total dietary fiber and whole grains is associated with a reduced risk of bladder cancer.

Screening
As of 2019 there is insufficient evidence to determine if screening for bladder cancer in people without symptoms is effective or not.

Treatment

The treatment of bladder cancer depends on how deeply the tumor invades into the bladder wall.

Treatment strategies for bladder cancer include:
 Non-muscle invasive: transurethral resection of bladder tumor (TURBT) with or without intravesical chemotherapy or immunotherapy
 Muscle invasive
 Stage II/Stage IIIA: radical cystectomy plus neoadjuvant chemotherapy (multimodal therapy, preferred) or transurethral resection with chemoradiation (trimodal therapy, highly selected people) or partial cystectomy plus neoadjuvant chemotherapy (in highly selected people)
 Stage IIIB/IVA: cisplatin-based chemotherapy followed by radical cystectomy or chemoradiation or observation depending on treatment response
 Stage IVB (locally advanced; unresectable tumors): palliative radiotherapy
 Metastatic disease: cisplatin-based chemotherapy
 Metastatic disease but unfit for cisplatin-based chemotherapy: carboplatin-based chemotherapy
 Metastatic disease with contraindication for chemotherapy: checkpoint inhibitors if programmed death ligand 1 (PD L1) positive
 Squamous cell carcinoma or adenocarcinoma of bladder: radical cystectomy

Non-muscle invasive

Transurethral resection

Non-muscle invasive bladder cancer (those not entering the muscle layer of the bladder) can be "shaved off" using an electrocautery device attached to a cystoscope, which in that case is called a resectoscope. The procedure is called transurethral resection of bladder tumor (TURBT) and serves primarily for pathological staging. In case of non-muscle invasive bladder cancer the TURBT is in itself the treatment, but in case of muscle invasive cancer, the procedure is insufficient for final treatment. Additionally, blue light cystoscopy with optical-imaging agent Hexaminolevulinate (HAL) is recommended at initial TURBT to increase lesion detection (especially carcinoma in situ) and improve resection quality thereby reducing recurrence. It is important to assess the quality of the resection: if there is evidence of incomplete resection, or if there is no muscle in the specimen (without which muscle invasiveness cannot be determined), then a second TURBT is strongly recommended. Moreover, nearly half of the people with high-grade noninvasive disease have residual tumor after primary TURBT; in such cases a second TURBT is important for avoiding under-staging. At this point classifying people into risk groups is recommended. Treatment and surveillance for different risk groups is indicated in the table below.

Another method for reducing recurrence of tumors is medication after TURBT surgery. The two most common medicines used for this purpose are Bacillus Calmette–Guérin (BCG) and mitomycin. For people who have already had a TURBT procedure, BCG may lead to similar risk of death and may reduce the risk of tumor recurrence. However, this medication may increase the risk of serious unwanted side effects. More research is needed to confirm these results.

Chemotherapy

A single instillation of chemotherapy into the bladder after primary TURBT has shown benefit in deceasing recurrence by 35% in non-muscle invasive disease. Medications which can used for this purpose are mitomycin C (MMC), epirubicin, pirarubicin and gemcitabine. Instillation of post-operative chemotherapy should be conducted within first few hours after TURBT. As time progress residual tumor cells are known to adhere firmly and are covered by extracellular matrix which decrease the efficacy of the instillation. The most common side effect is chemical cystitis and skin irritation. If there is a suspicion of bladder perforation during TURBT, chemotherapy should not be instilled into the bladder as serious adverse events are known to occur due to drug extravasation. Studies have shown that efficacy of chemotherapy is increased by the use of Device assisted chemotherapy . These technologies use different mechanisms to facilitate the absorption and action of a chemotherapy drug instilled directly into the bladder. Another technology – electromotive drug administration (EMDA) – uses an electric current to enhance drug absorption after surgical removal of the tumor. Another technology, thermotherapy, uses radio-frequency energy to directly heat the bladder wall, which together with chemotherapy (chemohyperthermia) shows a synergistic effect, enhancing each other's capacity to kill tumor cells.

Immunotherapy

Immunotherapy by Bacillus Calmette–Guérin (BCG) delivery into the bladder is also used to treat and prevent the recurrence of NMIBC. BCG is a vaccine against tuberculosis that is prepared from attenuated (weakened) live bovine tuberculosis bacillus, Mycobacterium bovis, that has lost its virulence in humans. BCG immunotherapy is effective in up to 2/3 of the cases at this stage, and in randomized trials has been shown to be superior to standard chemotherapy. The exact mechanism by which BCG prevents recurrence is unknown. However, it has been shown that the bacteria are taken up by the cancer cells. The infection of these cells in the bladder may trigger a localized immune reaction which clears residual cancer cells.

BCG is delivered as induction and a maintenance course. The induction course consists of 6-week course of intravesical and percutaneous BCG. This is followed by a maintenance course. There is no consensus regarding the maintenance schedule, however the most commonly followed is the Southwestern Oncology Group (SWOG) schedule. The SWOG maintenance schedule consists of intravesical and percutaneous BCG every week for 3 weeks given at 3, 6, 12, 18, 24, 30 and 36 months. Three weekly maintenance regimen with induction has shown complete response rate of 84% compared to 69% in people who received 6-week induction BCG only at 6 months. Many studies have explored alternate treatment schedules and regimes of BCG but has shown no clinical significance. Efficacy of different strains of BCG (Connaught, TICE, Pasteur, Tokio-172) has been shown not to be different however, there is no high-level evidence.

Side effects of BCG therapy include cystitis, prostatitis, epididymo-orchitis, balanitis, ureteral obstruction, bladder contraction, mycobacterial osteomyelitis, reactive arthritis, mycobacterial pneumonia, granulomatous hepatitis, granulomatous nephritis, interstitial nephritis, infectious vasculitis and disseminated infection.

Local infection (i.e. prostatitis, epididymo-orchitis, balanitis) because of BCG should be treated with triple tubercular therapy, with one of the drug being fluoroquinolone for 3 to 6 months. In people with systemic infections, BCG therapy should be stopped and anti-tubercular multidrug treatment for at-least 6 months should be started. Medications that can be used for this treatment are INH, rifampicin, ethambutol, fluoroquinolones, clarithromycin, aminoglycosides, and doxycycline. BCG strains are not sensitive to pyrazinamide therefore, it should not be a part of anti-tubercular treatment.

BCG treatment failure
BCG treatment failure can be classified into 3 groups; BCG relapse, BCG-refractory and BCG-intolerant. In BCG relapse, tumor reoccurs after a disease free period. BCG-refractory tumors are the ones which do not respond to induction and maintenance doses of BCG or which progress during therapy. In BCG-intolerant, tumor reoccurs due to incomplete treatment as the person receiving it is unable to tolerate an induction course of BCG. Around 50% of the people fail BCG treatment and would require further treatment.

People whose tumors recurred after treatment with BCG or who were unresponsive to treatment, are more difficult to treat. In such people a radical cystectomy is recommendation In people who do not show response to BCG therapy and are unfit or unwilling to undergo radical cystectomy, salvage therapies can be considered. Salvage therapy include intravesical chemotherapy with agents such as valrubicin, gemcitabine or docetaxel, chemoradiation or chemohyperthermia.

Muscle invasive

Multimodal therapy (standard treatment)

Untreated, non-muscle invasive tumors may gradually begin to infiltrate the muscular wall of the bladder (muscle invasive bladder cancer). Tumors that infiltrate the bladder wall require more radical surgery, where part (partial cystectomy) or all (radical cystectomy) of the bladder is removed (a cystectomy) and the urinary stream is diverted into an isolated bowel loop (called an ileal conduit or urostomy). In some cases, skilled surgeons can create a substitute bladder (a neobladder) from a segment of intestinal tissue, but this largely depends upon a person's preference, age of the person, renal function, and the site of the disease.

A bilateral pelvic lymphadenectomy should accompany radical cystectomy. At minimum, a standard template of lymphadenectomy should be followed by removing the external and internal iliac and obturator lymph node. When performing a lymphadenectomy, the surgeon can either remove lymph nodes from a smaller (standard) or from larger (extended) area. In comparison with a standard lymph node dissection, having an extended dissection may reduce a person's likelihood of death from any reason, including dying from bladder cancer. The extended procedure may lead to more serious unwanted effects and may or may not influence the likelihood of the cancer recurring over time. The rate of not-so-serious side effects may be similar for both surgeries.

Radical cystectomy has a significant morbidity associated with it. About 50-65% of the people experience complication within 90 days of surgery. Mortality rates was 7% within 90 days of surgery. High volume centers have better outcomes than low volume centers. Some centers are implementing Enhanced Recovery After Surgery (ERAS) society recommendations to decrease morbidity after radical cystectomy. However, due to lack of specific evidence in urologic surgery, ERAS protocol has not been widely incorporated in urologic clinical care.

Even after surgical removal of bladder, 50% of the people with muscle invasive disease (T2-T4) develop metastatic disease within two years due to micrometastasis. In such, neoadjuvant chemotherapy (chemotherapy before main treatment, i.e. surgery) has shown to increase overall survival at 5 years from 45% to 50% with an absolute survival benefit of 5%. Currently the two most used chemotherapy regimens for neoadjuvant chemotherapy are platinum based; methotrexate, vinblastine, doxorubicin, cisplatin (MVAC) and gemcitabine with cisplatin (GC). Other regimens include dose dense MVAC (DDMVC) and cisplatin, methotrexate and vinblastine (CMV).
Although, the optimal regimen has not been established, the preferred regimen for neoadjuvant therapy is MVAC.

Role of adjuvant chemotherapy (chemotherapy after main treatment) is limited to people with high grade tumours (pT3/T4and/or N+) and who have not been treated with neoadjuvant therapy. Adjuvant radiation therapy has not shown any advantage in bladder cancer treatment.

Trimodal therapy (alternative treatment)
A combination of radiation and chemotherapy (chemoradiation) in conjunction with transurethral (endoscopic) bladder tumor resection can be used as an alternative in certain people. Review of available large data series on this so-called trimodality therapy has indicated similar long-term cancer specific survival rates, with improved overall quality of life as for people undergoing radical cystectomy with urinary reconstruction. However, currently no randomized control trials are available which has compared trimodal therapy with radical cystectomy. People who undergo trimodal therapy are usually highly selected and generally have T2 disease without hydronephrosis and/or carcinoma in-situ. Five year cancer specific survival and overall survival after trimodal therapy is between 50% to 82% and 36% to 74%.

In trimodal therapy, a maximal TURBT is conducted followed by chemoradiation therapy. Radiation sensitizing chemotherapy regimens consisting of cisplatin or 5-flurouracil and mitomycin C are used. Radiation therapy is via external bean radiotherapy (EBRT) with a target curative dose of 64-66 Gy. Surveillance for progression or recurrence should conducted with the aid of CT scans, cystoscopies and urine cytology. Side effects of chemoradiation include nausea, vomiting, loss of appetite, hair loss, mouth sores, diarrhea, constipation, increased risk of infections and bleeding and fatigue.

In people who fail trimodal therapy, radical cystectomy is considered if there is muscle invasive or recurrent tumors. Around 25-30% fail treatment and undergo salvage radical cystectomy. TURBT with intravesical therapy is indicated after treatment failure for non-muscle invasive disease.

Partial cystectomy 
In people with solitary tumor without concurrent carcinoma in situ in an area where a clean surgical margins can be achieved, a partial cystectomy with lymphadenectomy can be considered. Management plan including partial cystectomy should be accompanied with neoadjuvant chemotherapy. In people with urachal adenocarcinoma of the bladder, a partial cystectomy with en-bloc resection of urachal ligament and umbilicus can be considered.

Metastatic disease

First line treatment
Cisplatin-containing combination chemotherapy is the standard of care for metastatic bladder care. Fitness for receiving cisplatin based chemotherapy is assessed before treatment. A person is deemed unfit if anyone of the following is true.
 Eastern Cooperative Oncology Group performance status of 2
 Creatinine clearance < 60 mL/min
 Grade ≥ 2 hearing loss
 Grade ≥ 2 neuropathy
 New York Heart Association Class III heart failure

People who are deemed fit receive platinum based regimens; methotrexate, vinblastine, doxorubicin, with cisplatin (MVAC) or gemcitabine with cisplatin (GC). Alternative regimens include paclitaxel with gemcitabine and cisplatin (PCG, triple therapy) and cisplatin, methotrexate and vinblastine (CMV). Response rate for cisplatin-based combination ranges from 39 to 65% and complete response is seen in 12-35% of the people. MVAC is better tolerated if it is combined with granulocyte colony-stimulating factor and the regimen is known as dose dense MVAC regimen (DDMVAC). This combination has shown to decease all cause mortality. MVAC regimen is aggressive. Febrile neutropenia (fever due to decrease in white blood cells) occurs in 10 to 14% and death due to toxicity in about 3-4%. Common side effects of MVAC include suppression of bone marrow, fever due to decrease in white blood cells, sepsis, mucositis, and nausea and vomiting. In contrast, the GC regimen has shown lower rates of neutropenic sepsis and grade 3/4 mucositis compared to MVAC. Efforts have been made to increase tolerance of cisplatin-based regimen by replacing it with carboplatin-based chemotherapy. However, cisplatin-based therapy is superior to carboplatin-based chemotherapy in achieving overall and complete response. Nevertheless, nearly half of the people with metastatic disease are "unfit" for cisplatin-based therapy. In such persons a combination of carboplatin and gemcitabine (GemCarbo) can be used as first line chemotherapy. In people who are not eligible for any platinum based chemotherapy and have PD-L1 expression, Atezolizumab and Pembrolizumab can be used.

People with bone metastasis should receive bisphosphonates or denosumab to prevent skeletal related events (e.g. fractures, spinal cord compression, bone pain).

Second line treatment
Bladder cancer that is refractory or shows progression after platinum-based chemotherapy can be treated with second-line chemotherapy or immunotherapy.

The most commonly used second-line chemotherapy is single-agent regimes of Taxanes (Paclitaxel, nab-paclitaxel and Docetaxel). Other single-agent regimes include Vinflunine, a third generation vinca alkaloid (approved in Europe), Gemcitabine, Pemetrexed, Oxaliplatin, and Ifosfamide. Side effects of Vinflunine include neutropenia, constipation, fatigue and anemia and has limited its use as a second line agent. Response to second-line chemotherapy occurs in 5%–20% people. Median progression free survival with second-line chemotherapy is 3–4 months.

In people with fibroblast growth factor receptors (FGFR) mutations and fail standard platinum based chemotherapy erdafitinib can be used. Erdafitinib has shown a response rate of 40% in these patients.

Five immunotherapy agents has been approved in the US for use in metastatic bladder cancer. They act by inhibiting programmed cell-death protein 1 (PD-1) or programmed cell-death ligand 1 (PD-L1). Pembrolizumab and nivolumab, and are inhibitors of programmed cell-death ligand 1 (PD-1). Avelumab, atezolizumab and durvalumab are inhibitors of PD-L1.

Pembrolizumab probably improves overall survival a little and may slightly improve quality of life for people with urothelial cancer that has worsened after initial treatment when compared with continued chemotherapy. However, pembrolizumab may have only minimal effects on the rate of death resulting from treatment or the rate at which the cancer advances. Pembrolizumab may cause less serious side effects than chemotherapy.

Surveillance and response
Contrast enhanced CT is used to monitor lung, liver, and lymph node metastases. A bone scan is used to detect and monitor bone metastasis. Treatment response is measured using the Response evaluation criteria in solid tumors (RECIST) into one of the following groups; response (complete or partial), stable disease and progressive disease.

Prognosis
People with non-muscle invasive tumors have a favorable outcome (5-year survival is 95% vs. 69% of muscle invasive bladder cancer). However, 70% of them will have a recurrence after initial treatment with 30% of them presenting with muscle invasive disease. Recurrence and progression to a higher disease stage have a less favorable outcome.

Survival after radical cystectomy and pelvic lymph node dissection is dependent on the pathological stage. If the disease has not spread to the lymph node and is limited to the bladder (T1 or T2, N0) the 5-year survival is 78%. If it has spread locally around the region of the bladder with no lymph node involved (T3, N0) then the 5-year survival drops to 47%. In disease with lymph node spread (N+, irrespective of T stage) the 5-year survival is 31%. Locally advanced and metastatic disease drastically decreases survival, with a median survival of 3–6 months without chemotherapy. Cisplatin-based chemotherapy has increased the median survival to 15-months. However, the 5-year survival is still 15%.

There are several prognostic factors which determine cancer specific survival after radical cystectomy. Factor with detrimental effect of cancer specific survival are old age, higher tumor grade and pathological stage, lymph node metastasis, presence of lymphovascular invasion and positive soft tissue margin. Lymph node density (positive lymph nodes/total lymph nodes observed in the specimen from surgery) is a predictor of survival in lymph node positive disease. Higher the density lower is the survival.

Quality of life

After radical cystectomy, urinary and sexual function remain inferior to the general population. People who have a neobladder have better emotional function and body image compared with ones with cutaneous diversion (who need to wear a bag to collect urine over their abdomen). Social factors such family, relationships, health and finances contribute significantly for determining good quality of life in people who have been diagnosed with bladder cancer.

A high percentage of people with bladder cancer have anxiety and depression. People who are young, single and have advanced clinical disease have a high risk for getting diagnosed with a psychiatric illness post-treatment. People with psychiatric illness post treatment seem to have worse cancer specific and overall survival.

Epidemiology

Globally, in 2017, bladder cancer resulted in 196,000 deaths, a 5.4% (age adjusted) decrease from 2007. In 2018, the age adjusted rates of new cases of bladder cancer was 6 cases per 100,000 people and age adjusted death rate was 2 deaths per 100,000 people. Lebanon and Greece have the highest rate of new cases. In Lebanon, this high risk is attributed to high number of smokers and petrochemical air pollution.

The risk of bladder cancer occurrence is four times higher in men than in women. Smoking can only partially explain this higher rates in men in western hemisphere. One other reason is that the androgen receptor, which is much more active in men than in women, may play a part in the development of the cancer. This hypothesis is also supported by the fact that men undergoing androgen suppression therapy for unrelated reason seem to have a lower risk of developing bladder cancer. In Africa, men are more prone to do field work and are exposed to infection with Schistosoma, this may explain to a certain extent the gap in incidence of squamous cell cancers in areas where bladder cancer is endemic. However, women present with more aggressive disease and have worse outcomes than men. This difference in outcomes is attributed to numerous factors such as, difference in carcinogen exposure, genetics, social and quality of care. One of the common signs of bladder cancer is hematuria and is quite often misdiagnosed as urinary tract infection in women, leading to a delay in diagnosis. Moreover, as mentioned earlier PSCA gene may play a role in aggressive tumors in women.

Canada
Bladder cancer is the sixth most common cancer accounting for 3.7% of the new cancer cases. in 2018, 30,700 Canadians were living with bladder cancer, 9160 new cases were diagnosed and 2467 died from it. In 2019, it is estimated that 11,800 new cases will be diagnosed and 2500 will die from it. Among the 11,800 new cases, 9100 will be in men and 2700 in women. Of the 2500 who would die from it, 1800 will be men and 700 will be women.

China
Bladder cancer is the 14th most common cancer and 16th most common cause of cancer death. In, 2018 it accounted for 82,300 new cases and 38,200 deaths. The number of new cases is comparatively lower compared to its western counterparts. Majority of the people are diagnosed with non-muscle invasive disease (75%) and the rest have muscle invasive disease (25%). Carcinoma in situ was present in only 2.4% of the cases.

Europe 
In 2015, 131,000 news cases were diagnosed in the European Union with 40,000 deaths. It is the 5th most common cancer and 9th most common cause of cancer deaths.. The 5-year relative survival for bladder cancers diagnosed between 2000 and 2007 is 69%. Geographic variation is seen in survival rates with 5-year survival rates of 75% in Northern to 65% in Eastern Europe.

United Kingdom
Bladder cancer is the ninth most common cancer in the UK accounting for 2.7% of all the new cancers cases. In 2018, there was 12,200 new cases and 6100 people died from it.

United States
In the United States in 2019 80,470 cases and 17,670 deaths are expected making it the sixth most common type of cancer in the region. Bladder cancer is the fourth most common type of cancer in men and the 12th most common cancer in women. Around 62,000 men and 19,000 women are diagnosed with bladder cancer in 2019. Between 2012 and 2016 annual rate of new bladder cancer cases decreased by one percent per year.

References

External links 

 
 Clinically reviewed bladder cancer information for patients, from Cancer Research UK
 Cancer.Net: Bladder Cancer
 EORTC calculator for non-muscle invasive bladder cancer risk stratification

 
Infectious causes of cancer
Wikipedia medicine articles ready to translate